Nemechek is a surname. Notable people with the surname include:

 Francis Nemechek (born 1950), American serial killer
 Joe Nemechek (born 1963), NASCAR driver
 John Nemechek (1970–1997), brother of Joe
 John Hunter Nemechek (born 1997), son of Joe